Kanno may refer to:

People
 Aya Kanno, manga artist
 James Kanno, elected as the first mayor of California's Fountain Valley.
 Mohamed Kanno, Saudi Arabian footballer
 Naoe Kanno, a fictional character from the anime/manga Strike Witches
 Takeshi Kanno, Japanese writer
 Yoko Kanno, composer and musician
 Yugo Kanno, composer and musician

Kannō (with a macron) may refer to:
 , Japanese era from 1350 to 1352

References